Pröll may refer to:

Politics

 Erwin Pröll (born 1946), Austrian politician, governor (Landeshauptmann) of Lower Austria
 Josef Pröll (born 1968), Austrian former politician, Vice Chancellor and Minister

Sports
 Annemarie Moser-Pröll (born 1953), Austrian alpine ski racer
 Cornelia Pröll (born 1961), Austrian former alpine skier
 Martin Pröll (born 1981), Austrian track and field athlete
 Markus Pröll (born 1979), German former soccer player

Other
 Fritz Pröll (1915–1944), German resistance fighter
 Roland Pröll (born 1949), German pianist, conductor, composer, musicologist, and professor for music

German-language surnames